Pavel Jelínek (born November 17, 1972) is a Czech physicist, member of an international group of scientists (from Japan, Spain and Czech Republic), that for the first time chemically identified individual atoms using an atomic force microscope and quantum-mechanical computation. More specifically, they were able to image surface of an alloy at atomic resolution and successfully identify tin, lead and silicon atoms on this surface.

References

Czech physicists
Living people
1972 births